The Africa Food Prize, originally the Yara Prize, is an annual award for contributions to African agriculture.

Yara Prize
Yara International, a Norwegian chemical company and a large producer of fertilizer, established the Yara Prize for a Green Revolution in Africa in 2005. According to the company, "The Yara Prize aims at celebrating significant achievements related to food and nutrition security and sustainable agriculture with a transformative power."

The first recipient was Meles Zenawi, prime minister of Ethiopia. The choice of recipient received criticism in Norway from human rights organisations and exiled Ethiopians, due to his political history. About 1 000 people demonstrated against the award being given to him. Human Rights Watch stated that

Africa Food Prize
In 2016, the Yara Prize became the Africa Food Prize, a $100,000 annual award. As of 2021, the Africa Food Price Committee is chaired by Olusegun Obasanjo, former president of Nigeria.

The first Africa Food Price winner was Kayano F. Nwanze, president of the International Fund for Agricultural Development. Obasanjo stated that "Dr. Nwanze's accomplishments on behalf of African farmers are a reminder of what's possible when you combine passion, good ideas, commitment, focus, hard work and dedication."

References

External links
 
 Norsk bistand bidrar til drap og tortur i Etiopia, 2016 opinion piece in Dagbladet, with photo of 2005 demonstration

African awards
Agriculture awards